The capture of Tahert occurred in 909 CE at the city of Tahert (present day Tagdemt) when the Fatimids led by Abu Abdallah al-Shi'i destroyed the city which resulted in the end of the Rustamid kingdom and the flight of the population into  near Ouargla, from where they would emigrate to Mzab in the 11th century.

References

Sources 

 
 

Medieval Algeria